is a village located in Kuma District, Kumamoto Prefecture, Japan.

In March 2017 the village had an estimated population of 3,553 and a population density of 29 persons per km². The total area is 121.2 km².

References

External links

Yamae official website 

Villages in Kumamoto Prefecture